Cirriformia is a genus of marine polychaete worms in the family Cirratulidae.

Species
The following species are classified in this genus:
Cirriformia afer (Ehlers, 1908)
Cirriformia capensis (Schmarda, 1861)
Cirriformia capillaris (Verrill, 1900)
Cirriformia chefooensis (Grube, 1877)
Cirriformia chefooensis Grube, 1877
Cirriformia chrysoderma (Claparède, 1869)
Cirriformia chrysodermoides Pillai, 1965
Cirriformia crassicollis (Kinberg, 1866)
Cirriformia filigera (Delle Chiaje, 1828)
Cirriformia limnoricola Kirkegaard & Santhakumaran, 1967
Cirriformia luxuriosa (Moore, 1904)
Cirriformia maryae Silva, 1961
Cirriformia melanacantha (Grube, 1872)
Cirriformia moorei Blake, 1996
Cirriformia multitentaculata Hartmann-Schröder & Rosenfeldt, 1989
Cirriformia nasuta (Ehlers, 1897)
Cirriformia pentatentaculata Hartmann-Schröder & Rosenfeldt, 1989
Cirriformia punctata (Grube, 1859)
Cirriformia quetalmahuensis Hartmann-Schröder, 1962
Cirriformia saxatilis (Gravier, 1906)
Cirriformia semicincta (Ehlers, 1905)
Cirriformia spirabrancha (Moore, 1904)
Cirriformia spirabranchia (Moore, 1904)
Cirriformia tentaculata (Montagu, 1808)
Cirriformia tortugaensis (Augener, 1922)
Cirriformia violacea Westheide, 1981

Synonyms
The following genera are accepted as Cirriformia:
Audouina  [auctt.] (misspelling of Audouinia Quatrefages)
Audouinia Quatrefages, 1865 (junior homonym)

References

Terebellida